Selemani Saidi Ally Bungara (born 18 November 1961) is a Tanzanian ACT Wazalendo politician and Member of Parliament for Kilwa South constituency since 2005 to 2020. In 2020 Hon Bungala joined ACT Wazalendo then loss his seat to Kassinge Ally

References

Living people
1961 births
Civic United Front MPs
Tanzanian MPs 2010–2015
Alliance for Change and Transparency politicians